Trinity Anglican Church is an Anglican church in central Ottawa, Ontario, Canada, at the corner of Cameron Avenue and 1230 Bank Street. Members of the church volunteer to serve Cornerstone, the Well, and the Centretown Churches Social Action Committee. Church members also founded and operate the Ottawa South Committee for Refugee Sponsorship.

Trinity (1876) was the third Anglican parish established in central Ottawa after St. Alban's 1865, and St. Bartholomew's 1867.

In late 2018, solar panels were added to the roof in order to produce some of the electricity consumed by the organization and generate financial income.

History

In January 1876, John Lewis, the Bishop of Ontario, asked T. W. Barry to call a special meeting of an ad hoc vestry. At four o'clock on the 15th of that month, Harry O. Wood, John J. Smyth, W. J. Parry, and T. Garrett met in the Billings Bridge Temperance Hall, on the south bank of the Rideau River, just south of Ottawa. Harry Wood moved, seconded by John Smyth, to establish a new Church of England mission on the north bank of the river, to be called Trinity Church Mission. The motion passed unanimously, and the meeting ended with the appointment of W. J. Parry as the first Warden. William Fleming held the first services of Trinity Church Mission at the Temperance Hall while the new church was being built.

On 24 August 1879, H. B. Patton conducted the first service in a new log building on the North side of the Rideau. Patton served Trinity until October 1882.

The Trinity Parish Guild began operating an annual food tent in August 1904, at the Central Canada Exhibition in Lansdowne Park. A Ladies' Guild was formed on May 16, 1916, then organized a cooking sale on June 3 of that year.

Robert Turley came to Trinity in 1923, and stayed until 1944. Turley was the longest-serving incumbent at Trinity.

A new Trinity Church was opened on Easter Day (4 April) 1926 with Bishop John Charles Roper as celebrant. The original log building was dismantled and reassembled as the Church of St. Thomas the Apostle on Churchill Avenue in the village of Sawmill Creek (now Alta Vista Drive). The original Trinity cornerstone was reversed and re-laid at St. Thomas by the Bishop on July 31, 1928 with a new inscription, "St. Thomas 1927" facing outwards.
 
On Ash Wednesday (19 March) 1947, a fire devastated Trinity. Adrian Bender and Mrs. Charles Paynter (a member of the Altar Guild), were trapped in the Vestry, but rescued by firemen. The rebuilt church was opened on 29 September 1948. The new building made extensive use of fireproof materials including concrete and asbestos.

Bishop Ernest Reed laid the cornerstone for a major addition to Trinity in November, 1957, including a large auditorium and a ladies' parlour. Reed dedicated the twelve new rooms and two new halls on 6 May 1958. The auditorium was re-dedicated Turley Hall after Robert Turley. The ladies' parlour was named the Canterbury Room, after the English cathedral. The Lower Hall was re-dedicated Bender Hall after Adrian Bender.

In 1981 Jackie Johnston became Trinity's first female Warden.

Music
In 1903, Natalie Frerichs began serving as Music Director. Natalie served in this role until 1949, and is Trinity's longest-serving Music Director to date.

The Brotherhood of St. Andrew was organized in 1907 by the men of the parish, and put on musicals for many years.

A special vestry was held on 11 March 1918, and approved the vesting of the Choir. On Good Friday, the newly vested choir sang the Crucifixion (Stainer).

Trinity's Casavant pipe organ was dedicated on 23 May 1963 by Bishop Reed to the memory of parishioners who were veterans of Canada's armed forces. Harvey Southcott became rector in 1968, and served until 1981. Harvey and his family lived in a new rectory, on Sunnyside Avenue. Archbishop William W. Davis celebrated a centennial re-dedication service at Trinity on 24 October 1976.

Notable people
Wilfred H. Bradley became incumbent at Trinity in 1950, serving for 17 years. Bradley went on to become the first Archivist of the Diocese of Ottawa.

References

Bibliography

External links
 

Anglican church buildings in Ottawa
20th-century Anglican church buildings in Canada